The Toyota Succeed is a now-discontinued station wagon/van sold by Toyota in Japan as passenger car and commercial van.

First generation (XP50) 
The first Succeed was introduced in July 2002 as the successor of Toyota Caldina Van. A more basic and shorter version is known as the Toyota Probox.

For 2007 Japanese models, G-Book, a subscription telematics service, was offered as an option.

2014 facelift (XP160) 

Since the 2014 facelift, the Succeed and Probox are identical. However, the Probox is also available with a 1.3-litre engine. The passenger variants of the two were discontinued and the role was taken over by Toyota Corolla Fielder Wagon. The Succeed was available through Toyota and Toyopet dealerships, while the Probox was sold through Corolla dealerships. Starting in 2018, Toyota Japan started merging its four dealership formulas, and the twinned model lines. In May 2020, the Succeed was discontinued.

References

External links
Succeed wagon 
Succeed Van 

Succeed
Compact cars
Station wagons
Cars introduced in 2002
2010s cars
2020s cars